Donggukisanggukjip (동국이상국집,東國李相國集) is a Korean  compilation book   written in 1241 by Goryeo Yi Gyubo. It is one of the books which mention the founding myth of Goguryeo.

History
The book consists of 53 volumes, and was woodblock printed. Ham(涵) who  was  son of Yi Gyubo edited and published the first 41 books and the last 12 books were published in December in the same year. In 1251, yik-bae(益培), grand son of Yi Gyubo corrected and  complemented the content by the order of then king of goryeo in an institute called bunsadaejangdogam(分司大藏都監).
The book was edited several times in the Joseon dynasty, but judging from the words of Joseon scholar Yi Ik that some of the lost volumes of the book was retrieved from Japan, the current edition is thought to be a reconstruction during the reign of king Yeongjo.

Content

First 41 volumes
The prologue was written by Lee Soo(李需). The first through 18th books contain poetry. Book 20 contains a biography section. Book 21 contains novels.

Last 12 volumes
These volumes contain a section dealing with the first king of Goguryeo, which has been of interest to historians.

References

Goryeo works